Benjamin Albert Glaspy (September 14, 1895 – May 8, 1963) was an American Negro league outfielder in the 1920s.

A native of Woodford County, Kentucky, Glaspy played for the Dayton Marcos in 1926. He died in Dayton, Ohio in 1963 at age 67.

References

External links
 and Seamheads

1895 births
1963 deaths
Dayton Marcos players
Baseball outfielders
Baseball players from Kentucky
People from Woodford County, Kentucky
20th-century African-American sportspeople